Mafi is the name of: 

Alfie Mafi (born 1988), Tongan rugby player
Lifeimi Mafi (born 1982), Tongan rugby player
Soane Patita Paini Mafi (born 1961), Cardinal; Bishop of Tonga
Tahereh Mafi (born 1988), American author of Iranian descent
Winston Mafi (born 1980), Tongan rugby player
Amanaki Mafi (born 1990), Tongan rugby union player who plays for the Japanese national side
Alex Mafi (born 1996), Australian rugby union player who plays for Queensland Reds
Falamani Mafi (born 1971), Tongan former rugby union player
Mateaki Mafi (born 1972), Tongan rugby football player who represented Tonga at the 1995 Rugby League World Cup, and at the 1992 Summer Olympics as a 200m sprinter
Matt Mafi (born 1993), Australian rugby union hooker who currently plays for Brisbane City in Australia's National Rugby Championship
Steve Mafi (born 1989), Australian-born rugby player who plays for the Western Force and Tonga
Parvaneh Mafi (born 1957), Iranian reformist politician and a member of the Parliament of Iran representing Tehran, Rey, Shemiranat and Eslamshahr electoral district

See also
Mafi (vehicles), a German manufacturer of commercial vehicles based in Tauberbischofsheim
Mafic minerals, silicates rich in magnesium and iron
Mafi roll trailer, a maritime shipping equipment
Surnames of Tongan origin
Tongan-language surnames